The Martian Chronicles is a 1995 video game developed by Byron Preiss Multimedia Company, released for Windows and Mac OS.

Gameplay
The Martian Chronicles is an adventure game based on the works of Ray Bradbury.

Reception
In 1996, Computer Gaming World declared The Martian Chronicles the 16th-worst computer game ever released. It received a largely negative review from Computer Game Review, whose writers called it "dull and lifeless".

Reviews
PC Gamer Vol. 3 No. 2 (1996 February) 
Computer Gaming World (Jan, 1996)
Entertainment Weekly (Dec 01, 1995)

References

1995 video games
Adventure games
Classic Mac OS games
Ray Bradbury
Simon & Schuster Interactive games
Video games developed in the United States
Windows games